The 2006 FIFA World Cup qualification CAF Group 4 was a CAF qualifying group for the 2006 FIFA World Cup. The group comprised Algeria, Angola, Gabon, Nigeria, Rwanda and Zimbabwe.

The group was won by Angola, who qualified for the 2006 FIFA World Cup instead of Nigeria based on head-to-head results (Angola 1–0 Nigeria; Nigeria 1–1 Angola). Angola, Nigeria and Zimbabwe qualified for the 2006 Africa Cup of Nations.

Second round

Standings

Results

4